Bolwarra is a rural locality in the Shire of Mareeba, Queensland, Australia.

Geography
The Lynd River and its tributary the Tate River both flow through the locality from east to west.

References 

Shire of Mareeba
Localities in Queensland